Lee Nam-sun (born 14 April 1961) is a South Korean speed skater. She competed at the 1976 Winter Olympics and the 1980 Winter Olympics.

References

External links
 

1961 births
Living people
South Korean female speed skaters
Olympic speed skaters of South Korea
Speed skaters at the 1976 Winter Olympics
Speed skaters at the 1980 Winter Olympics
People from Chuncheon
Sportspeople from Gangwon Province, South Korea
20th-century South Korean women